Southern College may refer to:

Former name for Southern Adventist University, a private Seventh-day Adventist university in Collegedale, Tennessee
Southern College, former name of Florida Southern College, a private college now in Lakeland, Florida